The 91st District of the Iowa House of Representatives in the state of Iowa.

Current elected officials
Mark Cisneros is the representative currently representing the district.

Past representatives
The district has previously been represented by:
 Lloyd F. Schmeiser, 1971–1973
 William E. Ewing, 1973–1975
 Fred L. Koogler, 1975–1979
 Harold Van Maanen, 1979–1983
 Randy Hughes, 1983–1987
 Jack Beaman, 1987–1995
 Rich Arnold, 1995–2003
 Dave Heaton, 2003–2013
 Mark Lofgren, 2013–2015
 Gary Carlson, 2015–2021
 Mark Cisneros, 2021–present

References

091